Aliabad-e Nasir Khani (also Romanized as ‘Alīābād-e Naşīr Khānī; also known as Naşīr Khānī) is a village in Kuhak Rural District, in the Central District of Jahrom County, Fars Province, Iran. At the 2006 census, its population was 91, in 20 families.

References 

Populated places in Jahrom County